This is a list of seasons completed by the Milwaukee Panthers football team of the National Collegiate Athletic Association.
The Milwaukee Panthers fielded their first team in 1956 coached by Armin Kraeft. They were previously members of the Wisconsin Intercollegiate Athletic Conference.

Seasons

References

Milwaukee Panthers

Milwaukee Panthers football seasons